Parufamet was the name of a distribution company established by the American film studios Paramount Pictures and Metro-Goldwyn-Mayer (MGM) and the German UFA GmbH in 1925. 

The company's founding was part of a loan contract between the studios. Paramount and MGM together loaned $4 Million to UFA, which was in a severe financial crisis, in December 1925. In return, UFA had to produce 40 films per year and reserve 75 percent of the capacities of its cinemas for productions by the American partners. Paramount and MGM agreed to show UFA productions in their cinema chains, but in reality, only few UFA productions played in the US, while at the same time being blocked from distribution on the domestic market.

In 1927, the contract's conditions were revised, the amount of films to be produced reduced from 40 to 20 per year, and the share of American productions shown in UFA's cinemas reduced from 75 to 33 percent. In 1932, the contract was disbanded.

References

Further reading
 

Film distributors of Germany
Paramount Pictures
Metro-Goldwyn-Mayer